Mufti Kifayatullah; born 5 August 1963) is a Pakistani Islamic scholar and senior politician of Jamiat Ulema-e-Islam (F). He also served as member of the Khyber Pakhtunkhwa Assembly from 2008 to 2013. He was arrested in April 2021 and then released on bail in July.

References

External links
 

Living people
Jamiat Ulema-e-Islam (F) politicians
Pakistani Islamic religious leaders
People from Mansehra District
Khyber Pakhtunkhwa MPAs 2008–2013
1963 births